The County of Flanders was one of the most powerful political entities in the medieval Low Countries, located on the North Sea coast of what is now Belgium. Unlike its neighbours such as the counties of Brabant and Hainaut, it was within the territory of the Kingdom of France. The counts of Flanders held the most northerly part of the kingdom, and were among the original twelve peers of France. For centuries, the economic activity of the Flemish cities such as Ghent, Bruges and Ypres made Flanders one of the most affluent regions in Europe, and also gave them strong international connections to trading partners.

Up to 1477, the core area under French suzerainty was west of the Scheldt and was called "Royal Flanders" (Dutch: Kroon-Vlaanderen, French: Flandre royale). Aside from this, the counts, from the 11th century onward, held land east of the river as a fief of the Holy Roman Empire: "Imperial Flanders" (Rijks-Vlaanderen or Flandre impériale). The county joined its Low Country neighbours within the Burgundian Netherlands from 1384, which eventually complicated its relationship with France. Most of the county became part of the Empire after the Peace of Madrid in 1526 and the Peace of the Ladies in 1529.

Having already regained much, by 1795, the rest – within the Austrian Netherlands – was acquired likewise by France under the French First Republic, recognized by treaty in 1797. Resulting from the Battle of Waterloo of the same year, it passed to the newly established United Kingdom of the Netherlands in 1815. The former County of Flanders, except for French Flanders, is the only part of the late medieval French kingdom outside of modern-day France (Catalonia having been renounced in 1258).

Etymology 
Flanders and Flemish (Dutch: Vlaanderen, Vlaams) are likely derived from the Frisian *flāndra and *flāmisk (in Old Frisian flamsk), the roots of which are Germanic *flaumaz meaning "overflow, flooding". The coastal area of Flanders was flooded twice per day from the 3rd century to the 8th century by the North Sea at the time when the coast was frequently visited by Frisian (cattle) traders and probably largely inhabited by Frisians.

The Flemish people are first mentioned in the biography of Saint Eligius (ca. 590–660), the Vita sancti Eligii. The work was written before 684 but has been known only since 725. This work mentions the "Flanderenses", who lived in "Flandris."

Geography 

The geography of the historic County of Flanders only partially overlaps with present-day region of Flanders in Belgium, but even there, it extends beyond the present provinces of West Flanders and East Flanders. Some of the historic county is now part of France and the Netherlands. The land covered by the county is spread out over:
 Belgium:
 two of the five Flemish provinces: West Flanders and East Flanders
 part of the Flemish province of Antwerp: the land of Bornem
 part of the Walloon province of Hainaut: Tournaisis and the region around Moeskroen (that belonged to West Flanders until 1962)
 France:
 French Flanders (in the Nord departement)
 the French westcorner: the region around Dunkirk, Bergues and Bailleul, an area where Flemish used to be the main language
 Walloon Flanders, where the Picard language, closely related to French, was spoken.
 Artois (in the Pas-de-Calais department): removed from Flanders in 1191 and created as independent county in 1237
 Netherlands:
 Zeelandic Flanders, a region between Belgium and the Western Scheldt in the southern part of the modern province of Zeeland, which from 1581 formed part of the Generality Lands under control of the Dutch Republic.

Flag and arms 

The arms of the County of Flanders were allegedly created by Philip of Alsace, count of Flanders from 1168 to 1191; a climbing or rampant black lion on a gold field. In the story about the Battle of the Golden Spurs, the arms and its corresponding battlecry Vlaendr'n den leeuw ("Flanders, the Lion!") plays a crucial role in the forming of a Flemish consciousness, which was popularised in recent times by the book De Leeuw van Vlaanderen by Hendrik Conscience. As a result, the arms of the county live on as arms of the Flemish Community.

It is said that Philip of Alsace brought the lion flag with him from the Holy Land, where in 1177 he supposedly conquered it from a Saracen knight, but this is a myth. The simple fact that the lion appeared on his personal seal since 1163, when he had not yet taken one step in the Levant, disproves it. In reality Philip was following a West-European trend. In the same period lions also appeared in the arms of Brabant, Luxembourg, Holland, Limburg and other territories. It is curious that the lion as a heraldic symbol was mostly used in border territories and neighbouring countries of the Holy Roman Empire. It was in all likelihood a way of showing independence from the emperor, who used an eagle in his personal arms. In Europe the lion had been a well-known figure since Roman times, through works such as the fables of Aesop.

History

Prehistory and antiquity 
The future county of Flanders had been inhabited since prehistory. During the Iron Age the Kemmelberg formed an important Celtic settlement. During the times of Julius Caesar, the inhabitants were part of the Belgae, a collective name for all Celtic and Germanic tribes in the north of Gallia. For Flanders in specific these were the Menapii, the Morini, the Nervii and the Atrebates.

Julius Caesar conquered the area around 54 BC and the population was partially romanised from the 1st to the 3rd century. The Roman road that connected Cologne with Boulogne-sur-Mer was used as a defense perimeter. In the south the Gallo-Romanic population was able to maintain itself, while the north became a no-mans land that also suffered from regular floods from the North Sea.

In the coastal and Scheldt areas Saxon tribes gradually appeared. For the Romans, Saxon was a general term, and included Angles, Saxons, Jutes and Erules. The coastal defense around Boulogne and Oudenburg, the Litus Saxonicum, remained functional until about 420. These forts were manned by Saxon soldiers.

From their base land Toxandria the Salian Franks further expanded into the Roman empire. The first incursion into the lands of the Atrebates was turned away in 448 at Vicus Helena. But after the murder of the Roman general Flavius Aëtius in 454 and Roman emperor Valentinianus III in 455, the Salic Franks encountered hardly any resistance. From Duisburg, king Chlodio conquered Cambrai and Tournai, and he reached the Somme. After his death two Salic kingdoms emerged. Childeric is recorded in 463 as king of Tournay and ally of the Romans against the Visigoths. He was also administrator of the province of Belgica Secunda. His son Clovis I conquered from 486 on all of Northern France.

Early Middle Ages 
The abandoned coast and Scheldt region had been partially repopulated since the 4th century by Saxons and Franks from the east of the Rhine that retained their Germanic culture and language. In the 5th century Salic Franks settled in present-day Northern-France and Wallonia, primarily around the cities of Courtrai, Tournai and Bavay. They adapted to the local Gallo-Romanic population. From the 6th century on the no-mans-land farther north was filled by Franks from the Rhinelands and other Germanic groups from the Netherlands and Germany.

The first wave of immigration in the present day Flemish territory was accompanied by limited Christianisation. In the wake of the immigrants, missionaries tried to convert the heathen population, but had little success. The bishoprics were reinstated, usually with the same natural borders of the Late-Roman era; the Silva Carbonaria separated the Bishopric of Cambrai from the Bishopric of Tongeren, while the Scheldt again became the border between the bishoprics of Cambrai and Tournai. Vedast and Eleutherius of Tournai were assigned to reinstate the bishoprics of Arras and Tournai. However, these bishoprics failed to survive independently. In the late 6th century the bishopric of Arras was connected to that of Cambrai, and at the start of the 7th century the same was done to the bishoprics of Tournai and Noyon.

At the end of the 6th century the duchy of Dentelinus was created in the north of what would later constitute Neustria. This duchy presumably included the bishoprics Boulogne, Thérouanne, Arras, Tournai, Cambrai and Noyon, thus the northwestern region between the North Sea and the Silva Carbonaria, an area whose outlines were very similar to the later Flanders. The duchy of Dentelinus was primarily meant as a military and strategical deterrent against Frisian and Saxon invasions. It was a cornerstone in the military defense of the Merovingian Empire. In 600 Chlothar II (584–628) was forced to temporarily cede the duchy of Dentelinus to Austrasia, but after restoration of Austrasian dual-monarchy in 622/623 the duchy was returned.

7th century 

At the end of the 6th and the 7th century a new inflow emerged from the western Pas-de-Calais. This area had been germanised in the 5th century and descendants of the Saxons and Franks had settled in future Flanders and the Duchy of Brabant. New groups of germanic settlers also came in from the Netherlands and Germany. Their new settlements often received the name of their germanic leader, with '-inga haim' added. -Inga haim meant 'the settlement of the tribe of X'. For example: Petegem comes from Petta-inga-haim, which meant 'the settlement of the tribe of Petta'.

The colonisation and germanisation of Flanders took place primarily in the 6th and 7th centuries. In the 7th century the population-level had risen sufficiently to start rebuilding the religious, military and administrative infrastructure. In the area of linguistics, the situation stabilised so that a large, bilingual region with a linear language border could emerge in the 8th century. In Pas-de-Calais, which had been densely populated a long time, a language barrier had emerged in the 6th–7th century, but in the 9th century a romanisation-movement started that has continued until the present day.

The Christianisation attempts in the 6th century by bishops like Eleutherius and Vedast had largely failed. Thus, in the 8th century a different strategy was chosen. A new Christianisation attempt was made under influence from king Dagobert I. He appointed several devoted missionaries from the southern parts of his kingdom to his royal domains in the northern parts of his kingdom. The missionaries were tasked with founding monasteries and abbeys there, that were to serve as centers of Christianity in a pagan region. From these centers, the conversion of the local populace could be started.

In 649 Audomar founded an abbey at Sithiu (the Abbey of Saint Bertin) and in 680 Aubertus founded the Abbey of St. Vaast near Arras. The Christianisation of the population was mainly the work of missionaries like Amandus (St. Bavo's Abbey and St. Peter's Abbey in Ghent) and Eligius (coastal region and Antwerp). In his 'vita', Eligius makes the first mention of the word 'Flanders', when he toured the area around 650.

During the 7th century the first Gaue or pagi were created in the Flemish territories. Gaue were administrative subdivisions of the civitates. The Gaue from the 7th and 8th century would form the basis of the county of Flanders. The pagus Tornacensis dates from ca. 580, and from the 7th century we know of the 'pagus Cambracinsis' in 663, the pagus Taroanensis from 649 and the pagus Bracbatensis at the end of the century. From the 8th century we know of the pagus Rodaninsis from 707, the pagus Gandao from the first quarter of the 8th century, the pagus Mempiscus from 723 and the pagus Flandrensis from around 745. Lastly, the pagus Austrebatensis and the pagus Curtracensis are also counted as Merovingian gaue.

Carolingians 

In 751 the Carolingian Mayors of the Palace succeeded in removing the Merovingians from power and obtaining the throne for themselves. The last Merovingian king, Childeric III, was placed in captivity at the later Abbey of Saint Bertinus in St. Omer, and his long hair, a symbol of royal power, was cut off.

Charlemagne succeeded his father Pepin the Short in Neustria and Austrasia, and after the death of his brother Karloman he was able to reunite the entire Frankish Empire. Though he resided in Aachen, he spent much time travelling through his territories. In 811 he inspected the fleet that he had ordered built in Boulogne and Ghent, to protect against Viking invasions.

The region comprising future Flanders was, from an economic point of view, a flourishing region, with a series of ports along the Scheldt river: Ghent, Tournai, Valenciennes, Cambrai and Lambres at Douai on the Scarpe and a number of seaports: Quentovic, Boulogne and Isère portus, a port at the mouth of the Yser. Moreover, the region included a number of rich abbeys, such as Abbey of Saint Bertin, Saint Bavo's Abbey, Saint-Amand Abbey and the Abbey of St. Vaast.

Charlemagne was succeeded by his son Louis the Pious. Even during Louis' life his three sons started fighting over his heritage. They eventually concluded multiple treaties, of which the Treaty of Verdun, signed in 843, would be the definitive treaty. These treaties created East Francia, Middle Francia and West Francia. West Francia, inherited by Charles the Bald, included the original county of Flanders, that spanned roughly between Oudenburg, Aardenburg and Torhout.

After the Middle-Frankish kings died out, the rulers of the West and East-Frankish Kingdoms divided the Middle-Frankish kingdom amongst themselves in the treaty of Meerssen in 870. Now Western Europe had been divided into two sides: the solid West Francia (the later France) and the loose confederation of principalities of East Francia, that would become the Holy Roman Empire.

In the north these two powers were separated by the Scheldt river, which had previously separated West Francia from Middle Francia. This separation remained unchanged until the times of Charles V, Holy Roman Emperor.

Growth in the 9th, 10th and 11th centuries (864–1071) 

Militarily, economically and politically, Europe went through a deep crisis. The Vikings invaded from the north, the Magyar from the east and the Saracens from the south. All left trails of destruction. The central authorities of the two Frankish kingdoms were unable to organise an effective defensive, causing the population to lose faith and trust in their far-removed rulers. In the wake of this power vacuum, local powerful individuals saw their chance. Often these individuals were the descendants of people associated with Charlemagne.

The county of Flanders originated from the Gau of Pagus Flandrensis, led by the Forestiers dynasty, who had been appointed by Charlemagne, who had made a small contribution by uniting small feudal territories in the higher parts of the Flemish Valley. The forestiers dynasty also strengthened the hold of the church on the relatively desolate area.

The first Margrave (Count) of Flanders was Baldwin I, who became count in 862, and a romantic anecdote is connected to this: Baldwin eloped with the daughter of the Frankish king Charles the Bald, Judith of West Francia. Judith, who had previously been married to two English kings, refused her father's command to return to him. After mediation by the pope, the Frankish king reconciled with his son-in-law, and gave him the title of margrave, and the corresponding feudal territories as dowry. Margrave was primarily a military appointment and some versions of the story theorize that King Charles made Baldwin Margrave in the hope that he would be killed by the Vikings.

Initially the French kings meant to secure the safety of the northern French border from Viking invasions with this act. The counts, however, made good use of the crisis situation by incorporating the surrounding plundered territories into the county. The counts expanded the influence of the original Flemish pagus over the years over all territories south and west of the Scheldt river, including presentday the lordship of the Four Amts, Zeelandic Flanders, the burgraviate of Aalst to the east and the County of Artois to the south, which remained part of Flanders until it became a separate county in 1237. After that date, the county of Artois at various times still came under the dominion of the count of Flanders as a separate title, until it was absorbed by the French crown.

Prosperity in the 12th and 13th century (1071–1278) 

The House of Flanders remained in power until 1119, when Baldwin VII of Flanders died heirless, and the county was inherited by Charles the Good, of the House of Denmark. He abandoned the title "Marquis of Flanders", which had been used alongside the comital style since the 10th century. The counts of Flanders were the last French lords using the title marquis, which would not be used again in France until 1504. After a short interlude under William Clito of Normandy (1127–1128), the county went to Thierry of Alsace of the House of Alsace. Under Thierry (1128–1168) and his successor Philip of Alsace, Flanders' importance and power increased.

In the second half of the 12th century, the county went through a period of great prosperity when Philip of Alsace managed to incorporate the County of Vermandois into Flanders through the inheritance of his wife. The territories he controlled now came to within 25 kilometers of Paris, and were larger than the territories his feudal lord, the French king, directly controlled.

During the rule of the House of Alsace, cities developed and new institutions were formed. The ports of Gravelines, Nieuwpoort, Damme, Biervliet, Dunkirk, and Mardijk were founded, as well as Calais by Philip's brother Matthew of Alsace. Aside from colonisation, the ports also functioned to reduce the silting of the rivers Aa, Yser and Zwin, which were endangering the accessibility of Saint-Omer, Ypres and Bruges. Biervliet also served as a counter to Hollandic influence.

Trade partners included England, the Baltic countries and France over sea, and the Rhineland and Italy over land. The wool trade with England was of special importance to the rising cloth industry in Flanders. The wealth of many Flemish cities (as their Belltowers and cloth halls testify) came from the drapery industry. Aside from this, the grain trade with England and through Holland with Hamburg were also important. Saint-Omer became the most important transit-port for French wine in the 12th century. These were the centuries of the breakthrough of the Flemish merchants, with their trade with England, the Baltic area and South-West France, as well as the landroutes to the Rhineland and Italy though later only the yearly fairs of Champagne. Flanders's flourishing trading towns made it one of the most urbanised parts of Europe.

In 1194, Baldwin I of Constantinople of the House of Hainaut, succeeded the House of Alsace.

The crisis of the 14th century (1278–1384) 
In 1278 Guy of Dampierre, of the House of Dampierre, became count of Flanders. The king of France wanted to definitively conquer Flanders, and started the Franco-Flemish War (1297–1305). Increasingly powerful in the 12th century, the territory's autonomous urban centres were instrumental in defeating the French invasion attempt, defeating the French at the Battle of the Golden Spurs in 1302. But finally the French prevailed at the battle of Mons-en-Pévèle and with the subsequent treaty of Athis-sur-Orge (1305) Flanders lost  Lille, Douai, and Orchies to France and had to pay exorbitant fines but retained their independence as a fief of the French kingdom. During this period, Flanders experienced a period of relative prosperity with its strong cloth industry and diverse artwork. Trade in Flanders was so extensive that statues of the Madonna and Child were made in Flanders with ivory, which was accessible only by the Indian Ocean trade networks.

Flemish prosperity waned in the following century, however, owing to widespread European population decline following the Black Death of 1348, the disruption of trade during the Anglo-French Hundred Years' War (1338–1453), and increased English cloth production. Flemish weavers had gone over to Worstead and North Walsham in Norfolk in the 12th century and established the wool industry.

The Burgundian 15th century (1384–1506) 

Through his marriage with Margaret of Dampierre in 1369, Philip the Bold, duke of Burgundy, made an end to the independence of Flanders. Flanders became the possession of the House of Valois-Burgundy, that ruled over the Burgundian State. In 1449 the city of Ghent revolted against duke Philip the Good. In 1453 Philip crushed the rebels at the battle of Gavere, ending the revolt.

The cities of Ghent and Bruges had previously operated virtually as city-states,
and upon the death of duke Charles the Bold attempted to re-assert this position by means of the Great Privilege that they wrested from Mary of Burgundy, Charles' daughter and successor. In 1482 this last Burgundian ruler died, making her young son Philip I of Castile of the House of Habsburg the new count, and her husband Maximilian I of Austria the regent. The Flemish cities staged two more revolts, but these were ultimately subdued by the armies of the Holy Roman Empire.

The 1493 Treaty of Senlis established peace between France and the Habsburgs; per the terms of the treaty, Flanders would henceforth be a territory of the Holy Roman Empire.

The seventeen provinces in the 16th century (1506–98) 

Under Charles V, Holy Roman Emperor (born in the Flemish city Ghent), Flanders became a member of the Burgundian Circle. The county was later involved in the Guelders Wars.

Through the Pragmatic Sanction of 1549, the County of Flanders was officially detached from France. It became an independent territory of the Holy Roman Empire. This constitutional act made Flanders part of the Seventeen Provinces, that constituted the Low Countries and from then on would be inherited as a whole.

The Low Countries held an important place in the Empire. For Charles personally, they were the region where he spent his childhood. Because of trade and industry and the rich cities, they were also important for the treasury. Lordship transferred to the Spanish branch of the House of Habsburg with Philip II of Spain, and after 1556 belonged to the Kings of Spain.

It was in Steenvoorde (In French Flanders) in 1566 that the Beeldenstorm broke loose. The Beeldenstorm spread through all of the Low Countries and eventually led to the outbreak of the Eighty Years' War and the secession of the Republic of the Seven United Netherlands. Originally Flanders cooperated with the northern provinces as a member of the Union of Utrecht, and also signed the Act of Abjuration in 1581, but from 1579 to 1585, in the period known as the "Calvinist Republic of Ghent", it was reconquered by the Spanish army.

The Spanish 17th century (1598–1713) 
Flanders stayed under Spanish control. Through the efforts of the French king Louis XIV, the entire southern part of Flanders was annexed by France, and became known as South-Flanders or French Flanders. This situation was formalised in 1678 at the Treaty of Nijmegen.

The Austrian 18th century (1713–89) 

After the extinction of the Spanish branch of the Habsburgs, the Austrian branch of the Habsburgs became counts of Flanders. Under Maria Theresa of Austria, the Austrian Netherlands flourished.

Last years (1789–97) 
In 1789 a revolution broke out against emperor Joseph II. In 1790 the county of Flanders and a separate province called West Flanders, which constituted the territories given back by France to the Emperor, were two of the founding members of the United States of Belgium. Just like the other parts of the Austrian Netherlands, the county of Flanders declared its independence. This took place on the Friday-market at Ghent on 4 January 1790. The "Manifest van Vlaenderen" was drawn up by Charles-Joseph de Graeve and Jean-Joseph Raepsaet.

The county of Flanders officially ceased to exist in 1795, when it was annexed by France, and divided into two departments: Lys (present day West Flanders) and Escaut (present day East Flanders and Zeelandic Flanders). Austria confirmed its loss in the 1797 Treaty of Campo Formio.

After the French Revolution the county was not restored, and instead the two departments continued their existence as the provinces of East and West Flanders in the Unitarian United Kingdom of the Netherlands and later, after the Belgian Revolution, in Belgium.

Count of Flanders title 
From 1840 onwards, the title "Count of Flanders" has been appropriated by the monarchy of Belgium. As a rule it was given to the second in line of succession to the Belgian throne. The title of count of Flanders was abolished by royal decision on 16 October 2001.

Important treaties and battles which involved the County of Flanders 
 Battle of Cassel (1071)
 Battle of Axpoele in 1128
 Peace of Peronne in 1199
 Battle of Bouvines in 1214
 Peace of Melun in 1226
 Battle of West-Kapelle in 1253
 Battle of the Golden Spurs in 1302
 Battle of Arke in 1303
 Battle of Zierikzee in 1304
 Battle of Mons-en-Pevele in 1304
 Treaty of Athis-sur-Orge in 1305
 Battle of Cassel (1328)
 Battle of Westrozebeke in 1382
 Eighty Years' War from 1568 to 1648
 Pacification of Ghent in 1576
 Union of Utrecht in 1579
 Act of Abjuration in 1581

See also 
 History of Flanders

References

Notes

Bibliography 
  (1948): "Vlaanderen, oorspronkelijke ligging en etymologie", in Album Prof. Dr. Frank Baur p. 192–220, Leuven.
  (1960): Toponymisch woordenboek van België, Nederland, Luxemburg, Noord-Frankrijk en West-Duitsland (voor 1226), Tongeren.
  (1977–1983): Algemene Geschiedenis der Nederlanden, Fibula-Van Dishoeck, Haarlem, 
  (2006): Geschiedenis van de Nederlanden, HBuitgevers, Baarn, 
  (1943): Korte geschiedenis van het ontstaan van het graafschap Vlaanderen van Boudewijn de IJzeren tot Robrecht den Fries, Brussels – The Hague.
  (1941–1942): "Het ontstaan van het vorstendom Vlaanderen", Belgisch tijdschrift voor filologie en geschiedenis, XX, 553–572 en XXI, 53–93.
  (1944): Vlaanderen onder de eerste graven, Antwerp.
  (1992): Medieval Flanders, London, 
  (1949–1958): Algemene Geschiedenis der Nederlanden, Haarlem – Antwerp.
  (1942): "De graven van Vlaanderen en hun domein, 864–1191", Wetenschappelijke Tijdingen, VII, 25–32.

External links 

 Maps (900–1350)
 Summary of the French expansionism into Flanders 

 
1380s in the Burgundian Netherlands
 
Flanders
Former provinces of France
History of Flanders
Flanders, County of
862 establishments